Marjana Bremec Homar (born June 6, 1946) is a Yugoslav and Slovenian former female basketball player.

External links
History women's basketball
Profile at fiba.com
Profile at fibaeurope.com

1946 births
Living people
Basketball players from Ljubljana
Slovenian women's basketball players
Yugoslav women's basketball players